Snake Eyes is a 1998 American mystery suspense-thriller film directed and produced by Brian De Palma. The film stars Nicolas Cage as a detective investigating a political assassination at a boxing match in Atlantic City, with supporting roles played by Gary Sinise, Carla Gugino, John Heard, Stan Shaw, Kevin Dunn, Joel Fabiani and Luis Guzmán. De Palma also co-wrote the story with David Koepp, who wrote the screenplay. The musical score was composed by Ryuichi Sakamoto.

The film was released and produced by Paramount Pictures, Buena Vista International and Touchstone Pictures on August 7, 1998. The film garnered mixed reviews from critics, criticizing the film's story, writing and pacing while praising its style and the performances. It grossed $104 million worldwide against a $73 million budget.

Plot
On a dark and stormy night, corrupt, flamboyant Atlantic City police detective Rick Santoro attends a boxing match at Atlantic City Arena between heavyweight champion Lincoln Tyler and challenger Jose Pacifico Ruiz. He meets up with his best friend since childhood, U.S. Navy Commander Kevin Dunne, who is working with the Department of Defense to escort Defense Secretary Charles Kirkland and Arena director Gilbert Powell at the fight after a trip to Norfolk, Virginia.

As the first round begins, Kevin is distracted by an attractive redhead named Serena who wears a ruby ring, and leaves his seat, which is then taken by Julia Costello, a mysterious woman with platinum blonde hair and a white satin suit. When Ruiz unexpectedly knocks out Tyler, gunshots ring out, mortally wounding Kirkland and grazing Julia, who loses her glasses and blonde wig, revealing her naturally dark hair. Kevin kills the sniper and orders the arena to be locked down. Despite the lockdown, Julia escapes into the casino, covers her wounds in pieces of cloth from her blouse and, after stealing a black satin jacket, disguises herself as a hooker.

Rick notices that the "knocked out" Tyler awoke instantly when the shots rang out and, after studying the fight tape, realizes the knockout punch didn't connect. Tyler confesses that he threw the fight in order to pay gambling debts, but he was never told that anyone would be killed and reveals that Serena, the redhead who tricked Kevin into leaving his post, paid him to take a dive. With Tyler, Serena and the sniper, along with the man who signaled Tyler to go down and whoever gave him the go-ahead, involved, Rick, suspecting a conspiracy, reveals everything he has learned to Kevin, who confesses that the trip to Norfolk was to test the AirGuard missile defense system, which Powell's company was backing. He deduces that the sniper, a known Palestinian terrorist named Tarik Ben Rabat, assassinated Kirkland over the Pentagon's large-scale defense cooperation with and weapons systems transfers to Israel.

Rick studies surveillance footage to find Serena while Kevin continues searching for Julia, aided by Powell's security guards. However, once they split up, it is revealed that Kevin is actually the fifth party and masterminded the conspiracy. He kills the now-blonde Serena and Zeitz (the man who signaled Tyler to go down) in order to prevent their further involvement and then conceals their bodies, aided by his bodyguards. Kevin then enlists Tyler by revealing the truth to him.

Julia seduces Ned Campbell, a sleazy guest at the hotel, so she can hide in his room. Both Rick and Kevin discover this simultaneously and give chase, but Rick reaches her first and takes her into protective custody. In a stairwell, Julia confesses that she is an analyst who worked on the AirGuard tests and discovered the results were faked to make the missile defense system look like it was working when it actually was not; the system failed to work and she tipped off Kirkland to the deception. However, Kevin discovered her actions and arranged the entire conspiracy to kill both her and Kirkland, using Rabat's background as a rabidly anti-Israel terrorist to have him kill the SECDEF and then be immediately killed off himself. Rick discovers Kevin's involvement and, despite initially refusing to believe it, quickly accepts the truth. After hiding Julia in a warehouse, Rick inspects the footage of a new floating camera and discovers proof of his friend's involvement.

Kevin confronts Rick and confesses that his motive was to prevent any further attacks on U.S. ships, similar to one on the USS Renville, where Kevin had to leave several men to drown in order to prevent the ship from sinking following an Iraqi missile strike. He offers Rick one million dollars for Julia's location. When Rick refuses, since the only thing he said is that Julia did nothing wrong, Kevin has Tyler beat him up, but he still does not give in. Kevin plants a tracker on Rick and follows him to the warehouse just as a hurricane hits Atlantic City. When a tidal wave hits the boardwalk, Rick uses it as cover to rush Julia outside, where the police, tipped off by Rick, are waiting and witness Kevin opening fire. Unable to escape the police and a news crew, Kevin commits suicide during the live news feed.

Rick is later hailed as a hero, but the press soon uncovers his corruption and he loses his job and family. Before reporting for his prison term, Rick meets Julia on the boardwalk. She thanks him for his help, as Powell is completely restructuring his company and scrapping the AirGuard. Rick promises to call when he gets out in twelve to eighteen months. Ultimately, Serena's ruby ring is seen embedded in one of the concrete pillars of the new Powell Millennium Arena.

Cast

 Nicolas Cage as Detective Rick Santoro, Atlantic City PD
 Gary Sinise as Commander Kevin Dunne, USN
 Carla Gugino as Julia Costello
 John Heard as Gilbert Powell
 Stan Shaw as Lincoln Tyler
 Kevin Dunn as Lou Logan
 Michael Rispoli as Jimmy George
 Joel Fabiani as Secretary of Defense Charles Kirkland
 Luis Guzmán as Cyrus
 David Anthony Higgins as Ned Campbell
 Mike Starr as Walt McGahn
 Peter McRobbie as Gordon Pritzker 
 Tamara Tunie as Anthea
 Chip Zien as Mickey Alter
 Alain Goulem as PPV Director
 Jayne Heitmeyer as Serena
 Chip Chuipka as Zeitz
 Éric Hoziel as Tarik Ben Rabat
 Mark Camacho as C.J.
 Adam Flores as Jose Pacifico Ruiz

Production

Casting 
De Palma offered the role of Commander Kevin Dunne to Al Pacino but he turned it down. Will Smith was then cast as Commander Kevin Dunne, but Smith later dropped out of the role as he wasn't offered enough money.

Filming 
The majority of Snake Eyes was filmed on studio sets and the Montreal Forum in Montreal, Canada. The production spent two weeks on-location in Atlantic City, New Jersey, filming at the Trump Taj Mahal Hotel & Casino (now the Hard Rock Hotel & Casino Atlantic City.

Unused ending 
Snake Eyes' original ending involved a huge tidal wave going through the casino. This visual effects-heavy ending was cut and replaced with a reshot sequence in post-production, but numerous references to it still remain in the final film. A shot near the end of the film shows an ambulance driving down an oceanside road with a wave about to crash into it before the film cuts to another shot, Rick Santoro talks about almost drowning at the very end of the film, and references to a storm are made throughout the entire film, which were all meant to build up to the cut climax.

Reception 
Released on August 7, 1998, Snake Eyes debuted at No. 2 on its opening weekend (behind Saving Private Ryan), with $16.31 million, beating out the weekend's other wide release Halloween H20: 20 Years Later at $16.19 million. It grossed $55.6 million in North America, and $103.9 million worldwide.

Critical response 
The film received a 41% "rotten" score on Rotten Tomatoes based on 66 reviews with the critics' consensus: "Snake Eyes has a number of ingredients that promise a trashy fun time; unfortunately, they're lost in an energetic and stylish thriller with a frustratingly hollow core." On Metacritic, the film has a weighted average score of 52 out of 100 based on reviews from 24 critics, indicating "mixed or average reviews." Audiences surveyed by CinemaScore gave the film a grade "C+" on scale of A+ to F. De Palma himself responded to the criticisms in an interview with Mark Cousins, "There's a lot of discussion in Snake Eyes about why do we reveal who did it so soon. Well, the problem is that it isn't about who did it. It's a mystery about a relationship, two people, and how finding that out affects their relationship ... those kinds of procedural movies are extremely boring..."

Accolades

See also
 List of films featuring surveillance
 List of American films of 1998

References

External links
 
 
 

1998 films
1998 crime thriller films
American crime thriller films
Films directed by Brian De Palma
Films set in New Jersey
Films shot in Atlantic City, New Jersey
Films shot in Montreal
Paramount Pictures films
Touchstone Pictures films
Films shot in New Jersey
Films set in Atlantic City, New Jersey
Films with screenplays by David Koepp
Films scored by Ryuichi Sakamoto
1990s English-language films
1990s American films